Kōzō-in (高蔵院) is a Buddhist temple in Tama, Tokyo Prefecture, Japan. It is dedicated to Yakushi Nyorai.

See also 
Thirteen Buddhas of Tama

External links 
 

Buddhist temples in Tokyo